The 2022 Pacific Office Automation 147 was the fourteenth stock car race of the 2022 NASCAR Xfinity Series and the first iteration of the event. The race was held on Saturday, June 4, 2022, in Portland, Oregon, at Portland International Raceway, a  permanent road course. The race was contested over 75 laps. In a caution filled race, A. J. Allmendinger, driving for Kaulig Racing, took the lead on the final restart, and would earn his 12th career Xfinity Series win, and his second of the season. To fill out the podium, Myatt Snider of Jordan Anderson Racing and Austin Hill of Richard Childress Racing would finish 2nd and 3rd, respectively.

Three drivers made their debut in this race: Connor Mosack, Darren Dilley, and Mason Filippi.

Background 

Portland International Raceway (PIR) is a motorsport facility in Portland in the U.S. state of Oregon. It is part of the Delta Park complex on the former site of Vanport, just south of the Columbia River. It lies west of a light rail station and less than a mile west of Interstate 5.

The track hosts the IndyCar Series, ICSCC and SCCA and OMRRA road racing, the NASCAR K&N Pro Series West, and SCCA autocross events. Additionally, the PIR grounds are host to OBRA (Oregon Bicycle Racing Association) bicycling races on the track and the surrounding grounds. The facility includes a dragstrip and a motocross track.

Entry list 

 (R) denotes rookie driver.
 (i) denotes driver who is ineligible for series driver points.

Practice 
The only 50-minute practice session was held on Friday, June 3, at 10:05 AM PST.

Qualifying 
Qualifying was held on Friday, June 3, at 5:05 PM PST. Since Portland International Raceway is a road course, the qualifying system is a two group system, with two rounds. Drivers will be separated into two groups, Group A and Group B. Each driver will have a lap to set a time. The fastest 5 drivers from each group will advance to the final round. Drivers will also have one lap to set a time. The fastest driver to set a time in the round will win the pole.

Round 2 was cancelled due to inclement weather.

Race results 
Stage 1 Laps: 25

Stage 2 Laps: 25

Stage 3 Laps: 25

Standings after the race 

Drivers' Championship standings

Note: Only the first 12 positions are included for the driver standings.

References 

2022 NASCAR Xfinity Series
Pacific Office Automation 147
2022 in sports in Oregon